Lotte Munk (born 8. October 1969 in Hals) is a Danish actress.

She is trained at the Drama School at Aarhus Theatre in 1995.

She is known from her role in The Killing II.

Filmography 
 Idioterne (1998) – Britta
 Familien Gregersen (2005) – Guest
 De fortabte sjæles ø (2007) – Magenta
 MollyCam (2008) – The police mans wife
 Hvidstengruppen (2012) - Erna Larsen

 Television series 
 Hotellet, episode 19 (2001) – Anja
 Ørnen (TV-serie), episodes 4-5, 8 (2004) – Dorte Lund Olsen
 Klovn (TV-show), episode 47 (2008) – Pernille
 The Killing II, episodes 4-5 (2009) – Lisbet Thomsen
 The Bridge'', season 2 (2013) – Caroline Brandstrup-Julin

References

External links
 Personal website
 

Danish actresses
1969 births
Living people